The Semnani languages or Komisenian languages are a group of Northwestern Iranian languages, spoken in Semnan province (only 68,700 native speakers in 2019) of Iran that share many linguistic features and structures with Iranian languages.  These languages are also called "dialects" in some sources. The Semnani languages are descendants of the extinct Parthian whereas the Caspian languages are descended from the extinct Median.

There are six Semnani languages named in the literature.  Some may be dialects, but there is little published work on their relationships.
Semnani (incl. one of several dialects termed 'Biyabunaki')
Sangsari
Sorkhei
Aftari
Lasgerdi

Cognate sets

Notes

Bibliography
Pierre Lecoq.  1989.  "Les dialectes caspiens et les dialectes du nord-ouest de l'Iran," Compendium Linguarum Iranicarum.  Ed. Rüdiger Schmitt.  Wiesbaden:  Dr. Ludwig Reichert Verlag.  Pages 296-314.
Habib Borjian. 2008. “The Komisenian Dialect of Aftar,” Archiv Orientální 76: 379-416.

Northwestern Iranian languages